Executive Complex is a building in San Diego, California. It is currently the 31st tallest building in San Diego.

References

External links
Executive Complex

Skyscraper office buildings in San Diego
Office buildings completed in 1963